The 2018 PCCL National Collegiate Championship is the tenth edition of the Philippine Collegiate Champions League (PCCL) in its current incarnation, the postseason tournament to determine the national collegiate champions in basketball. The tournament will be the 15th edition overall.

Tournament format
The tournament format was unveiled in November 2018.
Qualifying round
NCR qualifiers
2 teams from the UAAP
2 teams from the NCAA
NAASCU champion
ISAA champion
North/Central Luzon qualifiers
South Luzon/Bicol qualifiers
Visayas qualifiers
Mindanao qualifiers
Regional round
Luzon-NCR championship
North/Central Luzon qualifier
South Luzon/Bicol qualifier
NCR qualifier
VisMin championship
CESAFI champion
Visayas qualifier
Mindanao qualifier
Final round
Group A: UAAP champion vs NCAA champion (best-of-three)
Group B: Luzon/NCR champion vs. VisMin champion  (best-of-three)
Championship Game: Group A vs. Group B

Qualified teams

Qualifying round

NCR

North/Central Luzon

South Luzon/Bicol

Visayas

Mindanao

Regional round

Finals

Qualifying rounds

Visayas qualifier
The knockout game between the Iloilo champion Iloilo Doctors' College and Negros Occidental champions Colegio de Santa Ana de Victorias was held at the STI West Negros University Gym in Bacolod on November 8.
CSA-V's decisive 17–0 run at the start of the third quarter sealed the win for the Titans. They qualify to the Davao regionals.

North Luzon qualifiers

NCR qualifiers 
The NCR (Metro Manila) qualifiers were held from November 22 to 24 at the La Consolacion College - Manila and Lyceum of the Philippines University gyms in Manila.

Round 1

Semifinals

Final

South Luzon/Bicol qualifiers 
The South Luzon/Bicol qualifiers shall take place at the Jesse M. Robredo Coliseum in Naga, Camarines Sur from November 27 to December 1.

Elimination round

Group A

Group B

Bracket

Semifinals

Final

Mindanao qualifiers 
The Mindanao qualifiers is taking place at the Davao City Recreation Center from December 1 to 3.

Elimination round

Final

Regional rounds
If no team won all elimination round games, a regional final shall be played between the #1 and #2 teams.

Luzon regional

VisMin regional
The VisMin regional shall be held at the Arcadia Active Lifestyle Center in Davao City from December 4 to 5.

Final Four

Philippine Regional Championship
The Philippine Regional Championship was held at the Arcadia Active Lifestyle Center in Davao City from December 6 to 8.

Awards
Most Valuable Player: Rey Anthony Suerte (University of Visayas)
Mythical Five:
Emmanuel Ojuola (Naga College Foundation)
Josue Segumpan Jr. (University of Visayas)
Rey Anthony Suerte (University of Visayas)
Michael Heinrich Maestre (University of Visayas)
Gileant Delator (University of Visayas)

UAAP vs NCAA Showdown

Finals

Awards
Most Valuable Player: George Isaac Go (Ateneo de Manila University)
Mythical Five:
George Isaac Go (Ateneo de Manila University )
Bryan John Andrade (Ateneo de Manila University)
Rey Anthony Suerte (University of Visayas)
Ferdinand Ravena III (Ateneo de Manila University)
Bassier Sackor (University of Visayas)

References

2018-19
2018–19 in Philippine basketball leagues